Mount Katahdin is a mountain in Piscataquis County, Maine. Katahdin may also refer to:

 Katahdin sheep, a breed of domestic sheep developed in Maine
 Katahdin Iron Works, a Maine state historic site
 Katahdin Woods and Waters National Monument, a National Monument adjacent to Mount Katahdin
 USS Katahdin, two United States Navy vessels